John McPhee (born 1931) is an American writer.

John McPhee may also refer to:

 John McPhee (politician) (1878–1952), Premier of Tasmania
 John McPhee (footballer) (1937–2015), Scottish footballer
 John McPhee (motorcyclist) (born 1994), British Grand Prix motorcycle racer
 John Duncan McPhee (1894–1953), physician and politician in Ontario, Canada
 Bid McPhee (John Alexander McPhee, 1859–1943), American baseball player

See also 
 John McFee (born 1950), singer/songwriter